Vaspör is a village in Zala County, Hungary.  Its Birch House Tour includes one hectare garden.

References

Populated places in Zala County